Oto Joseph (born November 25, 1992) is a Nigerian professional boxer who held the African lightweight title from 2017 to 2020. As an amateur, he represented his country at the 2013 World Championships and 2014 Commonwealth Games.

Early years
In his youth, Joseph had an interest in both football and taekwondo. He then switched to boxing after watching his older brother train. Although his parents were originally against the decision, he won a gold medal at the National Sports Festival in 2012. He also represented his country at the 2013 World Amateur Championships and the 2014 Commonwealth Games.

Professional career
Joseph made his professional debut on March 15, 2015, defeating Kehinde Bhadmus with a second-round technical knockout (TKO) in Lagos. After defeating compatriot Fatai Nurudeen in October, he beat him in a rematch five months later for the Nigerian lightweight title via unanimous decision (UD). This was the first time he headlined a professional card (GOtv Boxing Night 7). He also defeated Hogan Jimoh Jr., son of Nigerian boxing legend Hogan Jimoh, stopping him in the first round at GOtv Boxing Night 6.

He received a shot at the vacant  lightweight title on March 26, 2017, facing Ghanaian veteran Mettle Ayitey at the Indoor Sports Hall of Obafemi Awolowo Stadium in Ibadan. He defeated Ayitey with a first-round TKO in the main event of GOtv Boxing Night 11 for the title. Joseph was scheduled to face South African Dillon Youle for the inaugural Commonwealth Africa lightweight title, but Youle was replaced by undefeated Malawian prospect Israel Kammwamba due to injury. He defeated Kammwamba by unanimous decision at GOtv Boxing Night 12 in Lagos for his third title belt.

On December 26, 2017, Joseph stopped Egyptian fighter Ahmed Abdulrahim for the African lightweight title at GOtv Boxing Night 13 in Lagos. He became the first African lightweight champion from Nigeria since two-time Olympian Christopher Ossai was stripped of the title in 1993. In his first successful title defense, he defeated Ghanaian contender Nathanael Nukpe by unanimous decision seven months later at GOtv Boxing Night 15 in the Indoor Sports Hall of Adamasingba Stadium.

In his first fight of 2019 he defended his African crown against Success Tetteh at GOtv Boxing Night 18 in Ibadan on April 21. He dominated the Ghanaian challenger in a short fight; the referee stopped it in the second round in Joseph's favor after Tetteh was visibly struggling to keep his balance.

Joseph was set to defend the African title against WABU lightweight champion Rilwan Oladosu in Lagos on October 12 in a matchup tagged the "Fight of the Decade" in Nigeria, but Joseph had to pull out after sustaining a shoulder injury in training. The mandatory title defense was pushed back to December, but Joseph did not recover in time and was unable to fight Oladosu. In January 2020, the African Boxing Union (ABU) announced it had stripped him of his lightweight title belt due to his inability to defend it in the stipulated time frame. Joseph claimed to have never received any correspondence from the ABU concerning the decision.

Professional boxing record

References

External links
 

Living people
1992 births
Nigerian boxers
Lightweight boxers
African Boxing Union champions
Boxers at the 2014 Commonwealth Games
People from Akwa Ibom State
Commonwealth Games competitors for Nigeria